Stefan Kievon Wayne Kelly (born 24 August 1988) is a Bermudian cricketer. He is a right-handed batsman and a right-arm fast-medium bowler.

At the age of 15, Kelly joined Oakham School in England on a sports scholarship in 2003 and represented the cricket first XI for three seasons. At the end of his lower sixth year in 2006, he interrupted his A-level studies to concentrate on playing for Bermuda in their preparations for the 2007 Cricket World Cup. Having been selected in Bermuda's final 15-man World Cup squad, he will returned to the school only after the completion of the tournament.

He has played five One Day Internationals for Bermuda to date, his debut at this level coming against Kenya in November 2006. He has also played for Bermuda in one ICC Intercontinental Cup game and in the 2006 ICC Americas Championship. In July 2022, he was named in Bermuda's squad for the 2022 Jersey Cricket World Cup Challenge League B tournament.

References

External links

1988 births
Living people
Bermudian cricketers
Bermuda One Day International cricketers
Bermuda Twenty20 International cricketers
People educated at Oakham School